Dragoljub Popović (born 25 July 1951) is a Serbian judge born in Belgrade and currently the Judge of the European Court of Human Rights in respect of Serbia.

References
he is no more in office, his mandate expired in April 2015

Living people
1951 births
Lawyers from Belgrade
20th-century Serbian judges
Judges of the European Court of Human Rights
Serbian judges of international courts and tribunals
21st-century Serbian judges